In the United States, campus carry refers to the possession of firearms on college or university campuses. Each state has its own discretion on laws concerning campus carry.

As of 2019, 16 states ban the carrying of a concealed weapon on a college campus; 23 states allow individual colleges and universities to make decisions on whether to prohibit or permit the carrying of a concealed weapon on their campuses; 11 states (either because of state legislation or judicial decision) permit the carrying of concealed weapons on public post-secondary college campuses; and one state (Utah) has a specific state law requiring all public colleges and universities to allow the carrying of concealed weapons on their property.

History 
The first state to legalize campus carry on a statewide basis was Utah in 2004.  In 2012, in a lawsuit brought by the activist group Students for Concealed Carry, the Colorado Supreme Court ruled that the 2003 Colorado Concealed Carry Act prohibited public universities in the state from regulating the possession of concealed handguns on campus. Before the 2012 decision, the University of Colorado System, although not other Colorado public universities had banned firearms possessions on its property, as a non-binding state attorney general's opinion stated that the University of Colorado was not subject to the Concealed Carry Act.

Public opinion 
Campus carry falls under the general gun debate in the United States.

”While there are a variety of First Amendment attacks to compulsory campus carry laws that can be made, there is no countervailing Second Amendment right to carry firearms on college campuses. Even if a court were to recognize such a right, the First Amendment rights to academic freedom and free speech trump this individual right to self-defense because firearms have a chilling effect on freedom of thought and speech, and these rights are more valued than firearms.”

Many believe that permitting firearms in a classroom would lead to disruption in the learning processes of students but also diminish the overall safety of students. "Ball State University found that 78% of students from 15 Midwestern colleges and universities would feel unsafe if students, faculty and visitors carried concealed firearms on campus" (Marc Randsford, 2014). In a study published in 2012, survey results from two college campuses indicated a majority of faculty, students, and staff (73%) did not want qualified individuals to be able to carry a gun on campus, 70% did not feel safer with more concealed guns on campus, and 72% did not think armed faculty, students, and staff would promote a greater sense of campus safety.

^That's one side of the debate.  How about the other?

Campus carry by state
There are three different forms of campus carry laws that states enact: mandatory, institutional, or non-permissive.

Mandatory refers to a law or court decision which requires a publicly funded institution to generally allow firearms on campus, though some locations may be exempted depending on the school policy (e.g. in a secure area, or at a sporting event). Restricted areas vary by state and individual school; refer to a school's specific policy for details. Some states require the firearm to be concealed (e.g. Texas) while others allow concealed or open carry (e.g. Utah).

Institutional refers to the decision of each institution to determine whether to allow firearms on campus. School firearm policies generally do not have the force of law. The majority of institutions in these states opt to ban guns with a few exceptions (e.g. Liberty University).

Non-permissive refers to the prohibition of firearms on any institutional property by law, with limited exceptions.

For full details for each state, including references to state laws and campus policies, see references.

See also
 Gun politics in the United States
 School shootings
 Higher education in the United States
 Concealed carry in the United States
 Gun politics

References

Gun politics in the United States
United States gun laws by state
Higher education in the United States